James Brian Beal (13 January 1929 – 1 October 1996) also known as Jimmy Beal, was a New Zealand boxer.

He won the silver medal in the men's middleweight division at the 1950 British Empire Games.

Beal moved to Australia and continued boxing in Melbourne (he trained at Palmers Gym Footscray), Sydney, and Brisbane. While boxing he also worked on the wharfs in Melbourne. When he retired from boxing Beal owned and operated a signwriting business in Crows Nest, North Sydney. Beal married Colleen in 1967, they had two boys John and Guy. Beal and his family moved to Brisbane in 1970. Beal had always loved drawing with Indian Ink and oil painting and was a member of the Redcliffe Art Society.

The last few years of his life he travelled throughout Australia, painting many striking portraits of famous and not so famous Australians and rugged landscapes. He continued to remain very fit throughout his life running every day, competed in every fun run he could in both Sydney & Brisbane. Beal died of leukaemia aged 67 years.

Professional boxing record

| style="text-align:center;" colspan="8"|3 Wins (2 knockouts, 1 decisions), 5 Losses (2 knockouts, 3 decisions), 0 Draws
|-  style="text-align:center; background:#e3e3e3;"
|  style="border-style:none none solid solid; "|Res.
|  style="border-style:none none solid solid; "|Record
|  style="border-style:none none solid solid; "|Opponent
|  style="border-style:none none solid solid; "|Type
|  style="border-style:none none solid solid; "|Rd., Time
|  style="border-style:none none solid solid; "|Date
|  style="border-style:none none solid solid; "|Location
|  style="border-style:none none solid solid; "|Notes
|- align=center
|Win
|3–5
|align=left| Jack O'Leary
|
|
|
|align=left|
|align=left|
|- align=center
|Loss
|2–5
|align=left| George Kapeen
|
|
|
|align=left|
|align=left|
|- align=center
|Loss
|2–4
|align=left| Don 'Bronco' Johnson
|
|
|
|align=left|
|align=left|
|- align=center
|Win
|2–3
|align=left| Johnny Virm
|
|
|
|align=left|
|align=left|
|- align=center
|Loss
|1–3
|align=left| Jack Smith
|
|
|
|align=left|
|align=left|
|- align=center
|Loss
|1–2
|align=left| Al Bourke
|
|
|
|align=left|
|align=left|
|- align=center
|Loss
|1–1
|align=left| Snowy Boyd
|
|
|
|align=left|
|align=left|
|- align=center
|Win
|1–0
|align=left| Cliff Kenworthy
|
|
|
|align=left|
|align=left|

References

1929 births
1996 deaths
20th-century New Zealand people
Middleweight boxers
Boxers at the 1950 British Empire Games
New Zealand professional boxing champions
Commonwealth Games silver medallists for New Zealand
New Zealand male boxers
Commonwealth Games medallists in boxing
Deaths from leukemia
Medallists at the 1950 British Empire Games